Kosh-Agachsky District (Koş-Agaş aymak; , Qosağaş audanı) is an administrative and municipal district (raion), one of the ten in the Altai Republic, Russia. It is located in the south and southeast of the republic. Its administrative center is the rural locality (a selo) of Kosh-Agach. As of the 2010 Census, the total population of the district was 18,263, with the population of Kosh-Agach accounting for 43.3% of that number.

Administrative and municipal status
Within the framework of administrative divisions, Kosh-Agachsky District is one of the ten in the Altai Republic. As a municipal division, the district is incorporated as Kosh-Agachsky Municipal District. Both administrative and municipal districts are divided into the same twelve rural settlements, comprising sixteen rural localities. The selo of Kosh-Agach serves as the administrative center of both the administrative and municipal district.

Population
Ethnic composition (2010):
 Kazakhs – 53.4%
 Altay – 40.5%
 Russians – 3.2%
 Others – 2.9%

References

Notes

Sources

Districts of the Altai Republic
 
